Beautiful Songs is a compilation album released in 2003 by first generation K-pop girl group S.E.S. This is S.E.S.' last album before officially disbanding. Although it comprises their Korean songs, the record was released only in Japan by their record label in the country, Avex Trax.

Track listing
 S.II.S (Soul To Soul)
 Just A Feeling (Liquid Electro Mix)
 Love
 U
 I Will...
 Dreams Come True
 I've Been Waiting For You
 Melody
 Snow X-Mas
 Tell Me
 Season In Love
 Friend
 Beautiful Life
 Show Me Love
 Love Game
 ('Cause) I'm Your Girl
 Running
 BRAND NEW ★ WORLD

External links 
 S.E.S.' Official Site  
 SM Entertainment's Official Site 

S.E.S. (group) albums
2003 compilation albums